Sound intensity, also known as acoustic intensity, is defined as the power carried by sound waves per unit area in a direction perpendicular to that area. The SI unit of intensity, which includes sound intensity, is the watt per square meter (W/m2). One application is the noise measurement of sound intensity in the air at a listener's location as a sound energy quantity.

Sound intensity is not the same physical quantity as sound pressure. Human hearing is sensitive to sound pressure which is related to sound intensity. In consumer audio electronics, the level differences are called "intensity" differences, but sound intensity is a specifically defined quantity and cannot be sensed by a simple microphone.

Sound intensity level is a logarithmic expression of sound intensity relative to a reference intensity.

Mathematical definition
Sound intensity, denoted I, is defined by

where
 p is the sound pressure;
 v is the particle velocity.

Both I and v are vectors, which means that both have a direction as well as a magnitude. The direction of sound intensity is the average direction in which energy is flowing.

The average sound intensity during time T is given by

For a plane wave ,

Where,
  is frequency of sound, 
  is the amplitude of the sound wave particle displacement,
  is density of medium in which sound is traveling, and 
  is speed of sound.

Inverse-square law

For a spherical sound wave, the intensity in the radial direction as a function of distance r from the centre of the sphere is given by

where
 P is the sound power;
 A(r) is the surface area of a sphere of radius r.

Thus sound intensity decreases as 1/r2 from the centre of the sphere:

This relationship is an inverse-square law.

Sound intensity level

Sound intensity level (SIL) or acoustic intensity level is the level (a logarithmic quantity) of the intensity of a sound relative to a reference value.

It is denoted LI, expressed in nepers, bels, or decibels, and defined by

where
 I is the sound intensity;
 I0 is the reference sound intensity;
  is the neper;
  is the bel;
  is the decibel.

The commonly used reference sound intensity in air is

being approximately the lowest sound intensity hearable by an undamaged human ear under room conditions.

The reference sound intensity I0 is defined such that a progressive plane wave has the same value of sound intensity level (SIL) and sound pressure level (SPL), since

The equality of SIL and SPL requires that

where  is the reference sound pressure.

For a progressive spherical wave,

where z0 is the characteristic specific acoustic impedance. Thus,

In air at ambient temperature, hence the reference value .

In an anechoic chamber which approximates a free field (no reflection) with a single source, measurements in the far field in SPL can be considered to be equal to measurements in SIL. This fact is exploited to measure sound power in anechoic conditions.

Measurement
Sound intensity is defined as the time averaged product of sound pressure and acoustic particle velocity. Both quantities can be directly measured by using a sound intensity p-u probe comprising a microphone and a particle velocity sensor, or estimated indirectly by using a p-p probe that approximates the particle velocity by integrating the pressure gradient between two closely spaced microphones.

Pressure-based measurement methods are widely used in anechoic conditions for noise quantification purposes. The bias error introduced by a p-p probe can be approximated by

This expression shows that phase calibration errors are inversely proportional to frequency and microphone spacing and directly proportional to the ratio of the mean square sound pressure to the sound intensity. If the pressure-to-intensity ratio is large then even a small phase mismatch will lead to significant bias errors. In practice, sound intensity measurements cannot be performed accurately when the pressure-intensity index is high, which limits the use of p-p intensity probes in environments with high levels of background noise or reflections.
 	
On the other hand, the bias error introduced by a p-u probe can be approximated by

Therefore, the phase calibration is critical when measurements are carried out under near field conditions, but not so relevant if the measurements are performed out in the far field. The “reactivity” (the ratio of the reactive to the active intensity) indicates whether this source of error is of concern or not. Compared to pressure-based probes, p-u intensity probes are unaffected by the pressure-to-intensity index, enabling the estimation of propagating acoustic energy in unfavorable testing environments provided that the distance to the sound source is sufficient.

References

External links

How Many Decibels Is Twice as Loud? Sound Level Change and the Respective Factor of Sound Pressure or Sound Intensity
Acoustic Intensity
Conversion: Sound Intensity Level to Sound Intensity and Vice Versa
Ohm's Law as Acoustic Equivalent. Calculations
Relationships of Acoustic Quantities Associated with a Plane Progressive Acoustic Sound Wave
Table of Sound Levels. Corresponding Sound Intensity and Sound Pressure
What Is Sound Intensity Measurement and Analysis?

Acoustics
Sound
Sound measurements
Physical quantities